The Cape sugarbird (Promerops cafer) is one of the eight bird species endemic to the Fynbos biome of the Western Cape and Eastern Cape provinces of South Africa.

Description
The Cape sugarbird is a grey-brown bird that is easily recognisable by a spot of yellow under its tail and the very long tail feathers present in males. The male is 34–44 cm long, and the shorter-tailed, shorter-billed, and paler breasted female 25–29 cm long. Another characteristic of the Cape sugarbird is the sound it makes when it flies. The main flight feathers are arranged in such a way that when the bird beats its wings, a frrt-frrt sound is made with the intention of attracting females.

Distribution and status
The Cape sugarbird is distributed throughout most of the fire driven ecosystem of the Fynbos in South Africa, the dominant vegetation type of the Cape Floral Region where there are flowering proteas and ericas. It is most common in areas that have not burnt recently, and almost absent from recently burnt areas. It is also found in gardens in summer when most proteas are not in flower, but urban birds are associated with greater stress measures. With a large population and extensive range, the Cape sugarbird is evaluated as Least Concern on the IUCN Red List of Threatened Species.

Behaviour

Food and feeding
The Cape sugarbird is a specialist nectar feeder when it comes to feeding off Proteaceae. Its long, sharp beak is used to reach the nectar of a variety of species of protea with its long brush-tipped tongue. The staple diet of this sugarbird is nectar; however, it will also eat spiders and insects. The characteristic strong winds in the Cape may make feeding off protea heads difficult, but the Cape sugarbird has adapted to this with the development of sharp claws. If they become hungry they could resort to eating their own kind.

Breeding
The breeding season for the Cape sugarbird is winter when food supplies are ample. Breeding males set up territories in mature stands of Protea bushes, where they perform vocal displays.

Gallery

References

External links
 
 Cape sugarbird - Species text in The Atlas of Southern African Birds.
 Cape sugarbird in Bloemfontein, SA

Promerops
Endemic birds of South Africa
Birds described in 1758
Taxa named by Carl Linnaeus